Stay Out may refer to:

"Stay Out", a song by Nina Nesbitt from Peroxide
"Get out and Stay Out", a song by The Who from Quadrophenia
Stay Out of the Basement, the second book in the Goosebumps original series
"Stay Out of My Life", a song by Five Star from Silk & Steel
Dino: Stay Out!, 1995 short film
Stay Out of Order, an album by The Casualties
Stay Out of the South, a 1927 composition by Harold Dixon